Sahan Peiris (born 19 September 1997) is a Sri Lankan cricketer. He made his Twenty20 debut for Galle Cricket Club in the 2017–18 SLC Twenty20 Tournament on 24 February 2018. He made his List A debut on 19 December 2019, for Lankan Cricket Club in the 2019–20 Invitation Limited Over Tournament.

References

External links
 

1997 births
Living people
Sri Lankan cricketers
Galle Cricket Club cricketers
Lankan Cricket Club cricketers
Place of birth missing (living people)